Henry Shimer (September 21, 1828 – July 28, 1895) was a naturalist and physician in Mount Carroll, Illinois.  He was also a teacher at the Mount Carroll Seminary, which later became Shimer College; he was the husband of the seminary's founder, Frances Shimer.

Biography

Early life
Shimer was born on September 21, 1828, in  West Vincent Township, Chester County, Pennsylvania.  He worked as a stone mason in his youth and took up teaching at the age of 18.
 
In March 1854, Shimer left Pennsylvania and traveled west to Mount Carroll, Illinois after a failed love affair.  He may have done work on the construction or expansion of the Mount Carroll Seminary, for which the owners were unable to pay him.

Marriage
On December 22, 1857, Shimer and Frances Ann Wood, the co-principal of the Mount Carroll Seminary, were married.  Their union was widely reputed to be a marriage of convenience.

Vocations
Shimer subsequently left for Chicago to study medicine.  He graduated from the Chicago Medical College on March 1, 1866.  Shimer also obtained a Master of Arts from the University of Chicago by examination.

He was a prolific entomologist and published widely, describing a number of novel species and genera.  He also served for a time as the assistant State Entomologist of Illinois.  In addition, he was an expert taxidermist, and had a collection of over 1000 mounted birds.  His collections were provided to the seminary for educational purposes.

In the 1880s, Shimer became wealthy by speculating on real estate in Iowa, allegedly inspired by a dream.  At the time of his death his estate was worth approximately $200,000.

Travels
Shimer traveled widely within the United States, stopping along the way to work as a stone mason.  He sometimes covered more than a thousand miles on foot.  He is said to have worn boots at all times.

Death
On July 28, 1895, Henry Shimer committed suicide, either with a revolver or by hanging.  He had amended his will five days previously to leave his entire fortune to his wife, leaving his mother and sister destitute.  In a highly publicized trial, the will was successfully contested.

Published works

1865, "Description of the Imago and Larva of a New Species of Chrysopa", Proceedings of the Entomological Society of Philadelphia
1867, "Description of a New Species of Aleyrodes", Transactions of the American Entomological Society 
1867, "Description of a New Species of Cecidomyia", Transactions of the American Entomological Society 
1867, "On a New Genus of Aphidae", Transactions of the American Entomological Society 
1867, "Notes on the Apple Bark Louse (Lepidosaphes conchiformis), with a Description of a supposed new Acarus"
1867, "Notes on Micropus (Lygarus) leucopterus Say ('The chinch bug')", Proceedings of the Academy of Natural Sciences of Philadelphia
1867, "Additional Note on the Chinch-Bug", Proceedings of the Academy of Natural Sciences of Philadelphia
1867, "On a new genus in Homoptera (Section Monomera)", Proceedings of the Academy of Natural Sciences of Philadelphia1868, "Descriptions of two Acarians bred from White Maple", Transactions of the American Entomological Society1868, "Notes on Chermes pinicorticis (white pine louse)", Transactions of the American Entomological Society1868, "A Summer's Study of the Hickory Galls, with Descriptions of supposed New Species bred therefrom", Transactions of the American Entomological Society1868, "The Wavy-Striped Flea Beetle", The American Naturalist1869, "Insects Injurious to the Potato", The American Naturalist1872, "Additional Notes on the Striped Squash Beetle", The American Naturalist 
1891, "Consciousness in Protoplasm", The Microscope''

References

External links
Guide to Henry Shimer, Epidemic Diseases 1866 at the University of Chicago Special Collections Research Center

1828 births
1895 deaths
People from Chester County, Pennsylvania
People from Mount Carroll, Illinois
Shimer College faculty
Feinberg School of Medicine alumni
University of Chicago alumni
American entomologists
Writers from Chicago
Writers from Pennsylvania
1890s suicides